The following is the 1964–65 network television schedule for the three major English language commercial broadcast networks in the United States. The schedule covers primetime hours from September 1964 through August 1965. The schedule is followed by a list per network of returning series, new series, and series cancelled after the 1963–64 season.

This is the first full season in which NBC broadcast more than 50% of its schedule in color, a fact which the network emphasized during its September 19–25 premiere week.

CBS and ABC, still mostly in black and white, continued rolling out rural sitcoms; in fall 1964 the networks added Gomer Pyle, USMC (CBS) and No Time For Sergeants (ABC) to their respective schedules. According to television historians Castleman and Podrazik (1982), critics objected to CBS's rural sitcom-heavy schedule, particularly the Gomer Pyle character, but the "high ratings earned by the silly gimmicks and simpleton heroes would assure rural sitcoms spots in the network schedules for years."

Castleman and Podrazik also point out the large number of "escapist" programs which debuted during the fall of 1964: Gilligan's Island (CBS), Bewitched (ABC), My Living Doll (CBS), The Addams Family (ABC) and The Munsters (CBS). Only NBC avoided the escapist trend during the season, with the exception of The Man From U.N.C.L.E..

All times are Eastern and Pacific. Premieres are highlighted in bold while endings are highlighted in italics.

Each of the 30 highest-rated shows is listed with its rank and rating as determined by Nielsen Media Research.

 Yellow indicates the programs in the top 10 for the season.
 Cyan indicates the programs in the top 20 for the season.
 Magenta indicates the programs in the top 30 for the season.

Sunday 

Notes: Mister Ed aired on CBS from 6:30 to 7:00 p.m. until January 1965, when World War One took over the time period.

On NBC, some episodes of Branded aired in color. Buckskin, which aired on NBC in July and August 1965, consisted of reruns of the 1958–1959 series.

Monday

Tuesday

Wednesday 
{| class="wikitable" style="width:100%;margin-right:0;text-align:center"
|-
! colspan="2" style="background-color:#C0C0C0;text-align:center"| Network
! style="background-color:#C0C0C0;text-align:center"| 7:30 PM
! style="background-color:#C0C0C0;text-align:center"| 8:00 PM
! style="background-color:#C0C0C0;text-align:center"| 8:30 PM
! style="background-color:#C0C0C0;text-align:center"| 9:00 PM
! style="background-color:#C0C0C0;text-align:center"| 9:30 PM
! style="background-color:#C0C0C0;text-align:center"| 10:00 PM
! style="background-color:#C0C0C0;text-align:center"| 10:30 PM
|-
! bgcolor="#C0C0C0" rowspan="2" | ABC
! Fall
| bgcolor="#F0F0F0" rowspan="2" | The Adventures of Ozzie and Harriet
| bgcolor="#FF22FF" rowspan="2" | The Patty Duke Show (28/22.4)
| bgcolor="#F0F0F0" | Shindig!
| bgcolor="#F0F0F0" | Mickey
| bgcolor="#F0F0F0" colspan="2" rowspan="2" | Burke's Law
| bgcolor="#F0F0F0" rowspan="2" | ABC Scope
|-
! Winter
| bgcolor="#F0F0F0"colspan="2" | Shindig!
|-
! bgcolor="#C0C0C0" rowspan="3" | CBS
! Fall
| bgcolor="#F0F0F0" colspan="2" | CBS Reports / CBS News Specials
| bgcolor="#00FFFF" rowspan="3" | The Beverly Hillbillies (12/25.6)
| bgcolor="#FFFF00" rowspan="3" | The Dick Van Dyke Show (7/27.1)
| bgcolor="#F0F0F0" rowspan="2" | The Cara Williams Show| bgcolor="#F0F0F0" colspan="2" rowspan="2" | The Danny Kaye Show|-
! Follow-up
| bgcolor="#F0F0F0" rowspan="2" | Mister Ed| bgcolor="#F0F0F0" rowspan="2" | My Living Doll|-
! Summer
| bgcolor="#F0F0F0" | Our Private World| bgcolor="#F0F0F0" colspan="2" | The Lucy-Desi Comedy Hour|-
! bgcolor="#C0C0C0" colspan="2" | NBC
| bgcolor="#FF22FF" colspan="3" | The Virginian (22/24.0) (Color)
| bgcolor="#F0F0F0" colspan="4" | NBC Wednesday Night at the Movies (Sporadically in Color)
|}

 Thursday 

 Friday 

 Saturday 

By network

ABC

Returning SeriesThe ABC Sunday Night MovieThe Adventures of Ozzie and HarrietThe AvengersBen CaseyBurke's LawCombat!The Donna Reed ShowThe Farmer's DaughterThe FlintstonesThe FugitiveThe Hollywood PalaceThe Jimmy Dean ShowThe Lawrence Welk ShowMcHale's NavyMy Three SonsThe Outer LimitsThe Patty Duke ShowSaga of Western ManWagon TrainNew Series12 O'Clock HighABC ScopeThe Addams FamilyThe ABC Sunday Night MovieBewitchedThe Bing Crosby ShowBroadsideF.D.R. *Jonny QuestThe King Family Show *MickeyNo Time for SergeantsPeyton PlaceShindig!The TycoonValentine's DayVoyage to the Bottom of the SeaWendy and MeNot returning from 1963–64:77 Sunset Strip100 GrandABC News ReportsArrest and TrialBreaking PointChanningDestryThe Edie Adams ShowEnsign O'TooleThe Fight of the WeekThe Greatest Show on EarthHootenannyThe Jerry Lewis ShowLaughs For SaleMake That SpareThe Price is RightThe Sid Caesar ShowThe Travels of Jaimie McPheetersCBS

Returning SeriesThe Andy Griffith ShowThe Beverly HillbilliesCandid CameraCBS News HourCBS News SpecialsThe Danny Kaye ShowThe Danny Thomas ShowThe DefendersThe Dick Van Dyke ShowThe Doctors and the NursesThe Ed Sullivan ShowGlynisGunsmokeHollywood Talent ScoutsI've Got a SecretThe Jackie Gleason ShowThe Joey Bishop Show (Moved from NBC)LassieThe Lucy ShowThe Lucy-Desi Comedy HourMister EdMy Favorite MartianOn Broadway TonightPasswordPerry MasonPetticoat JunctionRawhideThe Red Skelton HourSecret Agent Slattery's PeopleSummer PlayhouseTo Tell the TruthThe Twentieth CenturyVacation PlayhouseWhat's My Line?New SeriesThe Baileys of BalboaThe Cara Williams ShowThe Celebrity GameThe EntertainersFanfare *For the People *Gilligan's IslandGomer Pyle, U.S.M.C.Many Happy ReturnsMr. BroadwayThe MunstersMy Living DollOur Private World *The ReporterWorld War OneNot returning from 1963–64:BrennerEast Side/West SideThe Great AdventureHigh Adventure with Lowell ThomasThe Jack Benny Program (moved to NBC)The Judy Garland ShowMade in AmericaRoute 66SuspenseTell It to the CameraThe Twilight ZoneNBC

Returning SeriesThe Alfred Hitchcock HourThe Andy Williams ShowThe Bell Telephone HourThe Bill Dana ShowBob Hope Presents the Chrysler TheatreBonanzaBuckskinChrysler Presents a Bob Hope SpecialDr. KildareHazelInternational ShowThe Jack Benny Program (moved from CBS)The Jack Paar ProgramThe Jonathan Winters ShowKraft Suspense TheatreMr. NovakNBC Saturday Night at the MoviesPerry Como's Kraft Music HallThat Was the Week That WasThe VirginianWalt Disney's Wonderful World of ColorNew Series90 Bristol CourtBranded *Cloak of Mystery *Daniel BooneThe Famous Adventures of Mr. MagooFlipperHarris Against the WorldHullabaloo *International ShowtimeKarenKentucky JonesThe Man from U.N.C.L.E.Moment of FearNBC Wednesday Night at the MoviesProfiles in CourageThe RoguesTom, Dick and MaryNot returning from 1963–64:The DuPont Show of the WeekThe Eleventh HourEspionageFord Presents the New Christy MinstrelsGrindlHarry's GirlsHollywood and the StarsThe LieutenantThe Joey Bishop Show (moved to CBS)On ParadePerry Como's Kraft Music HallRedigoThe Richard Boone ShowSing Along with MitchTemple HoustonThat Was the Week That WasYou Don't Say!Note: The * indicates that the program was introduced in midseason.

References

 Castleman, H. & Podrazik, W. (1982). Watching TV: Four Decades of American Television. New York: McGraw-Hill. 314 pp.
 McNeil, Alex. Total Television. Fourth edition. New York: Penguin Books. .
 Brooks, Tim & Marsh, Earle (1964). The Complete Directory to Prime Time Network TV Shows'' (3rd ed.). New York: Ballantine. .

United States primetime network television schedules
1964 in American television
1965 in American television